Sinton High School is a public high school located in Sinton, Texas, United States, and classified as a 4A school by the UIL.  It is part of the Sinton Independent School District located in San Patricio County.

Athletics
Sinton compete in these sports - 

Football
Boys & girls basketball
Volleyball
Baseball
Softball
Boys & girls tennis
Boys & girls track & field
Boys & girls cross country
Boys & girls golf

State Titles
Baseball
2022(4A)

Notable alumni
Anthony Banda - MLB pitcher for the Tampa Bay Rays
Mike Adams - former MLB pitcher

References

External links
 

Schools in San Patricio County, Texas
Public high schools in Texas